Gregory Norman Ham (27 September 1953 – 19 April 2012) was an Australian musician, songwriter, and actor, best known as a member of the 1980s band Men at Work. He played saxophone, flute, organ, piano, and synthesizer.

Early life
Ham was born in Melbourne and attended Camberwell Grammar School from 1964 to 1971. According to the school's year books, he was remembered for his acting talent in school plays, particularly The World We Live In (the insect comedy) in 1969 where he played the "parasite". In 1970 he played Mr Seekamp, editor of the Ballarat Times, in Lola Montez and, in 1971, Puff in The Critic. In 1967 Ham was photographed airborne by J. Jones in a still photo which won first prize in the Ilford Competition.

Career

Men at Work 

In 1972, Ham met Colin Hay via mutual friend Kym Gyngell. In 1979, he joined the original lineup of Men at Work with Hay, Ron Strykert, and Jerry Speiser. Ham and Hay formed the core of the band from 1979 until 1985 when Ham left, and the band broke up shortly afterward. Ham returned to Men at Work when they reformed in 1996 to tour the United States.

Ham played saxophone, keyboards, flute, and harmonica for the group, as well as performing backing vocals. He sang lead vocals on songs such as "Helpless Automaton" and "I Like To." Ham also performed the saxophone solo in the song "Who Can It Be Now?" (a rehearsal take was used in the final mix) and improvised the flute riff in the song "Down Under".

Lawsuit and plagiarism accusation 
Larrikin Music bought the rights to the 1930s children's song "Kookaburra" in 1990 for $6,100. In 2009, music publisher Larrikin Music, then headed by Norman Lurie (now retired), sued Men at Work and their record label EMI for plagiarism, alleging that the flute riff copied the 1934 nursery rhyme "Kookaburra", to which they owned the publishing rights. The Federal Court of Australia ruled that "Down Under" did infringe the copyright of "Kookaburra" and awarded Larrikin 5% of the song's royalties backdated to 2002. Several appeals by EMI and Men at Work were unsuccessful. In an interview with The Age newspaper, Ham said he was deeply affected by the judgment and felt it tarnished his reputation, saying: "I'm terribly disappointed that that's the way I'm going to be remembered—for copying something." Colin Hay, Ham's childhood friend and bandmate chooses, however, to remember Ham as “a great, great friend and a great guy” who was a "very inspired and instinctive" musician."

Later career 
Ham played brass and keyboard with the R&B band Relax with Max, with frontman Max Vella, girlfriend Linda "Toots" Wostry, on saxophone, James Black on keyboard, David Adam and Ross Hannaford on guitar and John James "JJ" Hackett on drums.  Relax with Max played at the Metropol in Fitzroy and on ABC's television comedy While You're Down There and at the Falls Creek music festival. They supported Australian artists including Kylie Minogue and American soul singers James Brown and Bo Diddley. Ham also performed regularly with jazzy ensemble Miss Dorothy and His Fools in Love.  Later in life, Ham taught guitar at Carlton North Primary School and assessed music students for the Victorian Certificate of Education (VCE).

Death
Ham was found dead on 19 April 2012 at his home in Carlton North, Melbourne. Several newspapers listed the cause as a heart attack. There have been allegations that Ham had a long battle with heroin addiction, and the cause of death is still being debated. It is known that he was depressed and suffering anxiety over the copyright lawsuit filed against him and the members of Men at Work for the alleged similarities between "Kookaburra" and the flute riff in "Down Under".

Ham's private funeral was held at the Fitzroy Town Hall in Melbourne on 2 May 2012. Ham was survived by his two children.

References

External links
 

1953 births
2012 deaths
20th-century Australian pianists
Australian flautists
Australian keyboardists
Australian multi-instrumentalists
Australian new wave musicians
Australian pianists
Australian saxophonists
Male saxophonists
Men at Work members
Musicians from Melbourne
People educated at Camberwell Grammar School
Male pianists
Deaths from coronary artery diseas
20th-century flautists